Joe Lowrey (1879– 1948) was an Australian rules footballer.

See also
Jo Lawry, Australian singer and musician
Joseph Lowery (1921–2020), American minister and civil rights leader
Joseph Wilson Lowry (1803–1879), English engraver